"Încă o noapte" is a single by Romanian dance music group DJ Project and the most successful single on their Povestea mea album. The song reached #1 on the Romanian charts in the week from 28 August to 3 September 2006, particularly becoming a summer hit on Romania's Black Sea Coast.

Videoclip

The videoclip for Încă o noapte was filmed mainly in Bucharest's Embryo nightclub, known for its futuristic interior design. Parts of the clip were also filmed on Bucharest's streets at night, as well as in the city's new Mercedes-Benz Citaro buses.

Charts

See also
List of Romanian Top 100 number ones of the 2000s

References

External links
 Încă o noapte lyrics
Videoclip of Încă o noapte on YouTube
''Versuri lyrics' Search database for more lyrics

Romanian songs
2006 singles
2006 songs
Number-one singles in Romania